The 2012 LEB Oro promotion Playoffs is the final stage of the 2011–2012 LEB Oro season. It will start on 4 May 2012, and it will finish on June 8, 10 or 12 if necessary.

All the series will be played in a best-of-5 games format. The best seeded team plays at home the games 1, 2 and 5 if necessary. The winner of the playoffs will promote to 2012–13 ACB season with Iberostar Canarias, the champion of the regular season.

Bracket

Quarterfinals
Quarterfinals were played on May 4, 6, 11 and if necessary 13 and 15.

Ford Burgos – Cáceres Patrimonio de la Humanidad

Grupo Iruña Navarra – UB La Palma, la Isla Bonita

Menorca Bàsquet – CB Breogán

Club Melilla Baloncesto – Lleida Basquetbol

Semifinals

Club Melilla Baloncesto – Cáceres Patrimonio de la Humanidad

Grupo Iruña Navarra – Menorca Bàsquet

Final

Menorca Bàsquet – Club Melilla Baloncesto

References

External links
Spanish basketball federation website

LEB Oro playoffs
playoff